Akashdeep is a 1965 Hindi film directed by Phani Majumdar. The film stars Dharmendra, Mehmood, Ashok Kumar, Nanda and Nimmi. The film's music was composed by Chitragupta in notable songs like "Dil Ka Diya Jala Ke Gaya", sung by Lata Mangeshkar.

Cast
 Dharmendra As Tarun
 Mehmood As Madhu Gupta 
 Ashok Kumar As Shankar Gupta
 Nanda As Roma Gupta  
 Nimmi
 Shubha Khote As Sheela
 Chaman Puri
 Moni Chatterjee as Mama Of Ashok Kumar
 Chandrima Bhaduri as Vani Sinha
 Gopal Sehgal, in the song "Jaa Raha Hoon Main"
 Tarun Bose
 Achala Sachdev
 Keshto Mukherjee as Ramu
 Ramayan Tiwari

Soundtrack
 "Dil Ka Diya Jala Ke Gaya" - Lata Mangeshkar
 "Gaya Ujala" - Manna Dey
 "Ghar Mein Na Chawal" - Manna Dey
 "Gudiya Banke Naacho" - Asha Bhosle & Usha Mangeshkar
 "Jaa Raha Hoon Main" - Asha Bhosle, Manna Dey & S. Balbir
 "Mile Tu Phir Jhuke Nahin" - Lata Mangeshkar
 "Mujhe Dard E Dil Ka" - Mohammad Rafi
 "Suniye Jaanam" - Lata Mangeshkar & Mahendra Kapoor

References

External links 
 

1965 films
1960s Hindi-language films
Indian black-and-white films
Films scored by Chitragupta
Films directed by Phani Majumdar